Dinky may refer to:

Arts and entertainment
 Dinky Toys, a brand of die-cast toy vehicles
 Dinky (film), a 1935 film starring Jackie Cooper
 Dinky Bossetti, protagonist of the 1990 film Welcome Home, Roxy Carmichael, played by Winona Ryder
 title character of Dinky Dog, an animated segment on The All-New Popeye Hour TV series 
 Dinky Doodle, a cartoon character created by Walter Lantz in 1924
 Dinky Duck, a character in 14 Terrytoons cartoons from 1939 to 1957
 protagonist of the novel Dinky Hocker Shoots Smack by Marijane Meaker (under the pen name M. E. Kerr) and its TV adaptation
 Dinky Little, a character in The Littles children's novel series and TV series of the same name
 Dinky Doo, a placeholder name for a background baby unicorn in the children's cartoon My Little Pony: Friendship Is Magic

People
 Dinky Bingham (born 1963), African-American singer, musician, songwriter and producer
 nickname of Corazon Soliman (born 1953), Filipino politician 
 nickname of Dianne Van Rensburg (born 1968), South African retired tennis player
 DINKY, acronym for "Double Income, No Kids Yet", a childless couple in which both partners receive an income
 Double Income, No Kids Yet, a British radio sitcom originally broadcast 2001–2003

Other uses
 Dinky line (disambiguation) or just Dinky, slang for a short railroad line
 Dinky, nickname of the Princeton Branch commuter rail line in New Jersey
 Jackson Dinky, a line of mid-range electric guitars manufactured by Jackson Guitars

See also
 Dink (disambiguation)
 Dinkytown, an area in  Minneapolis, Minnesota, United States